Gudrun Margarete Elfriede Emma Anna Burwitz (née Himmler, 8 August 1929 – 24 May 2018) was the daughter of Heinrich Himmler and Margarete Himmler. Her father, as Reichsführer-SS, was a leading member of the Nazi Party, and chief architect of the Final Solution. After the Allied victory, she was arrested and made to testify at the Nuremberg trials. Never renouncing Nazi ideology, she consistently fought to defend her father's reputation and became closely involved in Neo-Nazi groups that give support to ex-members of the SS. She married Wulf Dieter Burwitz, an official of the extremist NPD.

Relationship with her father

Born in Munich in 1929, Gudrun Himmler was the daughter of Heinrich Himmler, Reichsführer-SS, Chief of Police and Security forces, and Reich Minister of the Interior in Nazi Germany. She was the only biological child of Himmler and his wife Margarete Siegroth, née Boden,  though her parents later adopted a son. (Himmler also had two out-of-wedlock children with his secretary, Hedwig Potthast.)

Heinrich Himmler adored his daughter and had her regularly flown to his offices in Berlin from Munich where she lived with her mother. When she was at home, he telephoned her most days and wrote to her every week. Heinrich always called her by her childhood nickname "Püppi". She accompanied her father on some official duties.

She disputed that Heinrich Himmler, who died in British captivity on 23 May 1945, died by suicide when he broke a concealed cyanide capsule, and instead maintained that he was murdered.
After the Second World War, she and her mother were arrested by the Americans and held in various camps in Italy, France and Germany. They were brought to Nuremberg to testify at the trials, and were released in November 1946. Gudrun later bitterly referred to this time as the most difficult of her life, and said that she and her mother were treated as though they had to atone for the sins of her father.

She never renounced the Nazi ideology and repeatedly sought to justify the actions of her father, relative to the context of his time. People who knew her say that Gudrun created a "golden image" of her father, like the father she wished she had. As well as being a Nazi, Himmler also had a history of cheating on his wife.

Later life
She married the far-right propagandist and author Wulf Dieter Burwitz, who later became a party official in the Bavarian section of the far-right NPD, and had two children. She was affiliated with Stille Hilfe ("Silent Aid"), an organization formed to aid former SS members, which assisted Klaus Barbie ("the Butcher of Lyon") of the Lyon Gestapo and Martin Sommer, otherwise known as the "Hangman of Buchenwald", and she reportedly continued to support a Protestant old people's home in Pullach, near Munich.

From 1961 to 1963, she worked, under an assumed name, as a secretary for West Germany's intelligence agency, the Federal Intelligence Service (BND), at its headquarters in Pullach. At the time the agency was headed by Reinhard Gehlen, an American-recruited general who hired, among others, ex-Nazis to work for BND based on their connections and experience with Eastern Europe and anti-communist activities.

For decades Gudrun Burwitz was a prominent public figure in Stille Hilfe. At various meetings, for instance the annual Ulrichsberg gathering in Austria, she received the status of both a star and an authority. Oliver Schröm, author of a book about the organisation, described her as a "flamboyant Nazi princess" ("schillernde Nazi-Prinzessin").

Peter Finkelgrun, a German-Jewish investigative journalist, discovered that Burwitz provided financial support for SS-Scharführer Anton Malloth, a former Nazi prison guard and a fugitive war criminal. In 2001, Malloth was convicted of beating at least 100 prisoners to death at the Theresienstadt concentration camp, including Finkelgrun's grandfather in 1943.

Gudrun Burwitz died on 24 May 2018 at her home near Munich at the age of 88.

Notes

References

Lebert, Norbert, and Stephan. Denn Du trägst meinen Namen: das schwere Erbe der prominenten Nazi-Kinder. Goldmann Verlag 2002,  (in German)
Lebert, Norbert, and Stephan. My Father's Keeper: Children of Nazi Leadership: An Intimate History of Damage and Denial, translated by Julian Evans. New York: Little, Brown, 2001. 

Schröm, Oliver and Andrea Röpke. Stille Hilfe für braune Kameraden. Christoph Links Verlag, Berlin 2001,  (in German)

External links

1929 births
2018 deaths
People from Munich
German neo-Nazis
Himmler family
German anti-communists
German nationalists
Women in Nazi Germany
People of the Federal Intelligence Service